Blakeborough's Bridge crosses the River Calder in Brighouse, West Yorkshire, England. It was built in 1962 to link J. Blakeborough and Sons works and offices that were on different sides of the river.

History
Built in 1962 to link J. Blakeborough and Sons works and offices in Birds Royd and River Street to Sherwood Works on the Armytage Road Industrial Estate. It was closed to vehicles c1980 after production ceased on the site. A public footpath crosses the bridge.

The Bridge was built to an American Specification and not to British Standard.

References

See also
List of crossings of the River Calder

Bridges over the River Calder
Bridges completed in 1962
Bridges in West Yorkshire
Brighouse